Zhang Wen (born 25 September 1992) is a Chinese badminton player. In 2014, he won the Grand Prix Gold title at the Bitburger Open tournament in the men's doubles event partnered with Wang Yilyu. He and Wang also won the men's doubles title at the China International Challenge tournament back to back from 2014–2016.

Achievements

Asian Championships 
Mixed doubles

Summer Universiade 
Men's doubles

BWF Grand Prix 
The BWF Grand Prix had two levels, the Grand Prix and Grand Prix Gold. It was a series of badminton tournaments sanctioned by the Badminton World Federation (BWF) and played between 2007 and 2017.

Men's doubles

  BWF Grand Prix Gold tournament
  BWF Grand Prix tournament

BWF International Challenge/Series 
Men's doubles

Mixed doubles

  BWF International Challenge tournament
  BWF International Series tournament

References

External links 
 

1992 births
Living people
Badminton players from Hunan
Chinese male badminton players
Universiade silver medalists for China
Universiade medalists in badminton
Medalists at the 2015 Summer Universiade